Elsie Maude Stanley Hall (22 June 1877 – 27 June 1976), commonly referred to as Elsie Stanley Hall, was a prominent Australian-born South African classical pianist.

Life
Hall was born in Toowoomba, Queensland, Australia, the oldest daughter of William Stanley Hall (c.1845 – 19 June 1927), a journalist, and his wife Mary Ann, née Sadgrove, a piano teacher. The name "Stanley" was carried in recognition of his mother's family. She was a sister of Rev. Jacob Stanley, president of the British Wesleyan Methodist Conference, and Sarah Chalkey Stanley, who married George Pearce Baldwin.

She took up the piano at the age of three, and was a child prodigy. In 1883 she attended the Intercolonial Juvenile Industrial Exhibition in Parramatta, New South Wales, and won a prize for her piano performance. In 1888 she was enrolled at the Stuttgart Conservatory in Germany. In 1890 she was awarded a pianoforte scholarship at the Royal College of Music, but declined and instead studied at Harrow Music School under John Farmer, and then at the Royal High School for Music in Berlin. Her patron there was Marie Benecke, eldest daughter of Felix Mendelssohn.

Hall married South African scientist Dr. Frederick Otto Stohr, originally Stöhr (1871–1946), in London on 22 November 1913. He had been conducting ornithological research in Northern Rhodesia (modern Zambia); they settled in South Africa, where he later practised medicine. When her father, founding editor of the Fiji Times and later on the literary staff of the Sydney Morning Herald, retired, he moved to South Africa to live with his daughter and son-in-law. 

She spent many years in South Africa, where she performed professionally on the piano well into her senior years. In 1958 (at age 80) she made a well-received tour of South Africa with Dutch violinist Herman Salomon, who had previously gained his reputation as leader of The Amsterdam string Quartet.

She appeared as a castaway on the BBC Radio programme Desert Island Discs on 28 April 1969.

Hall died at Wynberg, South Africa, and was buried at Hout Bay Cemetery.

Autobiography

References

External links
 YouTube 'Chabrier's Valse Romantique No. 3 played by Elsie Hall & Leslie Heward'

1877 births
1976 deaths
Australian classical pianists
Australian women pianists
Australian expatriates in Germany
Australian expatriates in England
Berlin University of the Arts alumni
Musicians from Queensland
South African classical pianists
People from Toowoomba
State University of Music and Performing Arts Stuttgart alumni
20th-century Australian women
Australian emigrants to South Africa